Richard Holloway FRSE (born 26 November 1933) is a Scottish writer, broadcaster and cleric. He was the Bishop of Edinburgh from 1986 to 2000 and Primus of the Scottish Episcopal Church from 1992 to 2000.

Early life and education

Born in Possilpark, Glasgow, and brought up in Alexandria in the Vale of Leven, Dumbartonshire, Holloway was educated at Kelham Theological College, Edinburgh Theological College and the Union Theological Seminary, New York City.

Career 
Between 1958 and 1986 he was a curate, vicar and rector at various parishes in England, Scotland and the United States. He was Bishop of Edinburgh from 1986 and was elected Primus of the Scottish Episcopal Church in 1992. He resigned from these positions in 2000 and is now regarded as one of the most outspoken and controversial figures in the church, having taken an agnostic worldview and commenting widely on issues concerning religious belief in the modern world. His own theological position has become increasingly radical and he has described himself as an "after-religionist", with strong faith in humanity.

Holloway is well known for his support of progressive causes, including campaigning on human rights for gay and lesbian people in both church and state. He is a patron of LGBT Youth Scotland, an organisation dedicated to the inclusion of LGBT young people in the life of Scotland. He has questioned and addressed complex ethical issues in the areas of sexuality, drugs and bioethics. He has written extensively on these topics, being the author of more than 20 books exploring their relationship with modern religion.

Holloway was elected as a fellow of the Royal Society of Edinburgh (1997) and holds honorary degrees from the universities of Strathclyde (1994), Aberdeen (1997), Napier (2000), Glasgow (2002) and St Andrews (2017). He was professor of divinity at Gresham College in the City of London. From 1990 to 1997, he was a member of the Human Fertilisation and Embryology Authority and held the position of chair of the BMA Steering Group on Ethics and Genetics. He was also a member of the Broadcasting Standards Commission and is a former chair of the Scottish Arts Council and Sistema Scotland.

Holloway has been a reviewer and writer for the broadsheet press for several years, including The Times, The Guardian, The Independent, Sunday Herald and The Scotsman. He is also a frequent presenter on radio and television, having hosted the BBC television series When I Get to Heaven, Holloway's Road and The Sword and the Cross. He currently hosts the BBC Radio Scotland book review programme Cover Stories. He presented the second of the Radio 4 Lent Talks on 11 March 2009. On 28 May 2012 he began presenting a 15-minute programme about faith and doubt, following The World at One on BBC Radio 4, called Honest Doubt: The History of an Epic Struggle and in 2016 he presented the Radio 4 series Three Score Years and Ten, a reflection on human mortality.

His book Leaving Alexandria: A Memoir of Faith and Doubt talks about his life from childhood, and his 2016 book, A Little History of Religion (published by Yale University Press), has received positive reviews from Peter Stanford of The Observer, Ian Thomson of The Financial Times ("exhaustive account"), Stuart Kelly of The Scotsman and John Charmley of The Sunday Times ("Holloway's technique, like his prose, beguiles"), among others. His book Waiting For The Last Bus was published in early 2018 and contains his reflections upon death and mortality. It has been praised for its "erudite quotes" on the subject.
His most recent book 'The Heart of Things'(2021) is a personal reflection on his life, with extracts from favourite poems. In the final chapter, on forgiving, he stresses an important fact that we can read our lives through the prism of heroism or defeat or resignation  or shame. But only admitting our own weakness will make us kind, help us identify with others and act kin to kin. In his closing verses he concludes that, in the absence of certainty about God or an afterlife, 'I, who walked the hills, I, who saw white hares dancing in the snow on Lammermuir,  should be grateful for life,  even as it passes'.

Personal life 
Holloway lives in Edinburgh with his American-born wife Jean. They have three adult children: two daughters and a son.

Selected works
 Beyond Belief (1982)
 Paradoxes of Christian Faith and Life (1984)
 The Way of the Cross (1987)
 Crossfire: Faith and Doubt in an Age of Uncertainty (1987)
 Who Needs Feminism? Male Responses to Sexism in the Church (1990)
 Anger, Sex, Doubt and Death (1992)
 Dancing On The Edge: Faith In A Post-Christian Age (1997)
 Godless Morality: Keeping Religion out of Ethics (2000).
 Doubts and Loves: What is Left of Christianity (2000)
 On Forgiveness: How Can We Forgive the Unforgivable? (2002)
 Looking in the Distance: The Human Search for Meaning (2004)
 How To Read The Bible (2006)
 Between the Monster and the Saint (2012)
 Leaving Alexandria: A Memoir of Faith and Doubt (2014)
 A Little History of Religion (2016)
 Waiting For The Last Bus (2018)
 Stories We Tell Ourselves: Making Meaning in a Meaningless Universe (2020)
 The Heart of Things (2021)

References

External links
 Biography at the Westar Institute
 Address to the Royal Philharmonic Society Music Awards 2008

1930 births
Living people
Clergy from Glasgow
Primuses of the Scottish Episcopal Church
Bishops of Edinburgh
Scottish agnostics
Fellows of the Royal Society of Edinburgh
Scottish Episcopal theologians
Scottish television presenters
Scottish radio presenters
Scottish LGBT rights activists
20th-century Scottish Episcopalian bishops
Professors of Gresham College
Alumni of Kelham Theological College
Members of the Jesus Seminar
British former Christians
Former Anglicans